James Michael Tyler  (May 28, 1962 – October 24, 2021) was an American actor best known for his portrayal of Gunther on the NBC sitcom Friends. Prior to acting, he was an assistant film editor and production assistant. His early works included being the production assistant for Fat Man and Little Boy. He also portrayed Oscar Bevins in the 1997 thriller film Motel Blue.

Early life
James Michael Tyler was born on May 28, 1962, the youngest of five children, in either Greenwood, Mississippi or Winona, Mississippi.

When Tyler was ten years old, his father, a former USAF captain, died. Just one year later, when Tyler was age eleven, his mother passed away. Afterwards, Tyler moved to Anderson, South Carolina to live with his sister. Tyler graduated from T.L. Hanna High School in 1980.

He graduated from Anderson College (now Anderson University) in 1982 with a two-year Associate's degree and subsequently graduated from Clemson University with a degree in geology in 1984. During his time at Clemson, he was a member of a student theatre group, the Clemson Players. This experience sparked his interest in becoming an actor. He received his Master of Fine Arts degree from the University of Georgia in 1987.

Career
In 1988, he moved to Los Angeles and became an assistant film editor and production assistant. The same year, he was a production assistant on the film Fat Man and Little Boy. In L.A., he also worked at Guitar Center and a coffee shop called the Bourgeois Pig. It was here that he met his first wife, Barbara Chadsey, whom he married in 1995. 

From 1994 to 2004, James Michael Tyler played Gunther on the sitcom Friends. Gunther was a coffee shop worker at Central Perk who had unrequited love for Rachel Green, played by Jennifer Aniston. His real-life experience as a barista gave an assistant director on Friends the idea to put him behind the counter of Central Perk to make the set seem more "authentic". This led to a ten-year career with appearances in 148 of Friends' 236 episodes; he is the show's most-frequently-appearing recurring character actor.

The night before his first appearance on Friends, a hair stylist friend asked if he could practice bleaching on Tyler's hair. Tyler agreed, and the makers of Friends loved it so much that what should have been a one-off look ended up becoming part of his character. He ended up having to bleach his hair every week for ten years. 

In honor of Friends 15th anniversary in 2009, Tyler officially opened the temporary Central Perk pop-up replica in London. It was open for two weeks from September to October and fans could apply for tickets to receive a free coffee and see memorabilia from the show. He appeared in the unaired pilot satire sitcom Nobody's Watching, playing himself on the set of Central Perk.

In honor of Friends 20th anniversary in 2014, Tyler made appearances at a Central Perk replica in SoHo.

Tyler appeared in the BBC/Showtime sitcom Episodes (Series 2, Episode 6) as himself playing an ice hockey coach, when Matt LeBlanc tries unsuccessfully to get the other main stars from Friends to appear in the promotional video for the fictional television show Pucks.

He supported the Lili Claire Foundation and AIDS Project Los Angeles charities.

Personal life
In 1995, Tyler married Barbara Chadsey. The couple separated in 2003, and in 2014, he filed for divorce, citing irreconcilable differences. He later married Jennifer Carno in 2017.

Death
Tyler was diagnosed with prostate cancer in 2018, but did not publicly disclose his illness until June 2021, shortly after the release of Friends: The Reunion. The cancer metastasized to his spine, leading him to use a wheelchair. He died of complications from the disease at his home in Los Angeles, California, on October 24, 2021, at the age of 59.

Filmography
In addition to the below, Tyler narrated and hosted the 2005 game Friends: The One with All the Trivia, along with the 2005 DVD board game

Film

Television

Music video

If You Knew spoken word performance
In July 2021, producers Al Gomes and Connie Watrous of Big Noise, along with two-time Emmy Nominee Tim Labonte and Grammy Award winner Alan Boyd, conceptualized and created a short film for Tyler's spoken word performance entitled If You Knew. 

Tyler's recording had been featured on a 2016 tribute album to The Beach Boys' lyricist Stephen Kalinich called Be Still that Gomes, Watrous, and Boyd had also produced. The Recording Academy placed the collection on the Official Ballot for the 58th Annual Grammy Awards for Best Spoken Word Album. Tyler also composed the music for the recording.

The new video for If You Knew was produced to honor Tyler and also create a fundraiser for the organization that was working closely with him, the Prostate Cancer Foundation. All the streaming proceeds of the video, and Tyler's original recording, are being donated to the Prostate Cancer Foundation.

Notes

References

External links

Video: James Michael Tyler – If You Knew
Spoken Word Tribute Album: Be Still : The Works of Stephen J. Kalinich – Spotify
Spoken Word Tribute Album: Be Still : The Works of Stephen J. Kalinich – Apple Music
James Michael Tyler and Prostate Cancer Foundation
Music Video: Chicane – Come Tomorrow

1962 births
2021 deaths
20th-century American male actors
21st-century American male actors
American male television actors
Anderson University (South Carolina) alumni
Burials at Hollywood Forever Cemetery
Clemson University alumni
Deaths from cancer in California
Deaths from prostate cancer
Male actors from Mississippi
People from Winona, Mississippi
People from Greenwood, Mississippi
University of Georgia alumni